Frankie Laine, is the second in a series of albums of the same name, recorded by Frankie Laine for Mercury Records.  This album is cataloged as MG 25026.

Track listing

References
The Frankie Laine Discography - 'Frankie Laine' MG 25026

Frankie Laine albums
1950 albums
Mercury Records albums